George Towns may refer to:

 George W. Towns (1801–1854), United States lawyer, legislator, and politician
 George Towns (rower) (1869–1961), Australian single sculls world champion

See also
Georgetown (disambiguation)